Feyyaz Uçar (born 27 October 1963) is a Turkish former professional football player, who played as a striker, and more recently a coach.

Career
Born in Istanbul, Turkey, Uçar started his football career at Avcılar Spor Klübü. Attracting various scouts while with Avcilar, he was transferred to Beşiktaş's junior squad only for new jerseys for the Avcılar team. After spending a season with the junior squad, Uçar made his professional debut with the A team in the 1981–1982 season. In the 1989–1990 season, he became the top scorer in the league with 28 goals. Uçar transferred to Fenerbahçe SK in 1994. He was loaned to Antalyaspor in 1995. Following year, he was sent to Kuşadası SK for one season. On 31 May 1997, he retired from active footballer.

Uçar served as an assistant coach with following the clubs: Çanakkale Dardanelspor (2000–2001), Göztepe SK (2001–2002), Denizlispor (2002). He came back to Beşiktaş J.K. to assist Mircea Lucescu and served for the club for four seasons. In February 2005, he signed a one-and-a-half-year contract to coach the Secondary League club Karşıyakaspor in İzmir. However, after two months he signed with the Süper Lig team Malatyaspor to replace Aykut Kocaman who resigned following a 1–0 home defeat by Rizespor. Uçar left Malatyaspor early in the 2005–2006 season after the team's disastrous start. His most recent managerial positions include Karşıyaka (2006–2007), Mardinspor (2007) and Altay (2007–2009).

Honours
Beşiktaş
Süper Lig: 1985–86, 1989–90, 1990–91, 1991–92
Turkish Cup: 1988–89, 1989–90
Turkish Super Cup: 1986, 1989, 1992
Prime Minister's Cup: 1998

Individual
Süper Lig top scorer: 1989–90 (28 goals)
Beşiktaş J.K. Squads of Century (Silver Team)

See also
 Metin-Ali-Feyyaz
 Ali Gültiken
 Metin Tekin

References

1963 births
Living people
Association football forwards
Turkish footballers
Turkish football managers
Beşiktaş J.K. footballers
Fenerbahçe S.K. footballers
Antalyaspor footballers
Turkey international footballers
Süper Lig players
Süper Lig managers
Altay S.K. managers
Karşıyaka S.K. managers
Yeni Malatyaspor managers